Maryna Vynohradova (born 30 June 1983) is a Ukrainian-Italian field hockey player for the Italian national team.

She participated at the 2018 Women's Hockey World Cup.

References

Italian female field hockey players
Female field hockey midfielders
1983 births
Living people